Burton B. "Burt" Nanus (born 1936, New York NY) is an American academic,  Professor Emeritus at the University of Southern California, where he was a faculty member from 1969 to 1994.

Biography
 
 Bachelor of Science, Stevens Institute of Technology, 1957 
 Master of Science, Massachusetts Institute of Technology, 1959
 Doctor of Business Administration, University of Southern California, 1967,He wrote his thesis on "The implications of EDP for multinational business operations."    
Prior to joining the University of Southern California, he worked at Sperry Rand Corporation, the System Development Corporation, and his own consulting firm, Planning Technology, Incorporated.

Academic work
Nanus is the author of several books:

(with Stephen M Dobbs) Leaders Who Make a Difference: Essential Strategies for Meeting the Nonprofit Challenge, San Francisco : Jossey-Bass 1999   
Leading the Way to Organizational Renewal,  Portland, Or. : Productivity Press, 1996
Visionary Leadership (J-B US non-Franchise Leadership), 1995
Translated into German as Visionäre Führung, into Spanish as 	Liderazgo visionario : forjando nuevas realidades con grandes ideas. and into Japanese as 	ビジョン・リーダー : 魅力ある未来像の創造と実現に向かって (Romanized JP: Bijon rīdā : Miryoku aru bijon no sōzo to jitsugen ni mukatte) 
The Vision Retreat: a Facilitator's Guide,  San Francisco : Jossey-Bass, 1995
Visionary Leadership: Creating a Compelling Sense of Direction for Your Organization,:	San Francisco : Jossey-Bass, 1992  According to WorldCat, the book is held in 1291 libraries  
Translated into Polish as Wizjonerskie przywództwo : jak stworzyć atrakcyjną wizję dla twojej organizacji?
The Leader's Edge: the Seven Keys to Leadership in a Turbulent World, Chicago : Contemporary Books, 1989
Leaders: The Strategies for Taking Charge, 1985, co-authored with Warren Bennis
Translated into French as Diriger
Developing strategies for the information society, 1982
The emerging network marketplace, 1981

References

External links

American educators
Living people
1936 births